"U Better Recognize" is Sam Sneed's first and only single while he was on Death Row Records.  The B-side was "Come When I Call" by Danny Boy.

Single information
"U Better Recognize" featuring Dr. Dre was released by Sam Sneed in 1994. He became known for the catchphrase, "I'm Sam Sneed, you better recognize!" (which he famously repeated on the intro to "Pump Pump", the eighteenth track from Snoop Dogg's debut album Doggystyle), from the song and the related Death Row film, Murder Was the Case. The single peaked at number 16 on the Billboard Hot Dance Music/Maxi-Singles Sales chart, 18 on the Hot Rap Tracks chart and 48 on the Hot R&B/Hip-Hop Singles & Tracks chart.

Music video
The music video featured Dr. Dre and was directed by Hype Williams.

Charts

References

1994 debut singles
Dr. Dre songs
Music videos directed by Hype Williams
1994 songs
Interscope Records singles
Death Row Records singles